The surname Gros may have several origins. French: a nickname for a big, fat person. In Several languages it is a spelling variant of Gername surname Gross.  Groș is a Romanian-language word for "Large". See also Legros.

Gros, Groș  may refer the following notable people:

 Sara Gros Aspiroz (born 1983), Spanish ski mountaineer
 Antoine-Jean Gros (1771–1835), French painter
 Brigitte Gros (1925–1985), French journalist and politician
 Daniel Gros (born 1955), German economist
 Jean-Baptiste Louis Gros (1793–1870), French ambassador and one of the first daguerreotypists
 Jules Gros (1890–1992), Breton linguist
 Jules Gros (journalist) (1890–1891), French journalist and President of the unrecognised Republic of Independent Guyana
 Piet Gros (born 1964), Dutch chemist

References